Cepeşti may refer to several villages in Romania:

 Cepeşti, a village in Cungrea Commune, Olt County
 Cepeşti, a village in Bogdănița Commune, Vaslui County